Aharon Ben-Shemesh (1889–1988) was an Israeli writer, translator, and lecturer in Islamic Law at Tel Aviv University. He published a modern Hebrew translation of the Quran from the original Arabic in 1971, and an English translation in 1979.

Selected bibliography

References

1889 births
1988 deaths
Arabic–Hebrew translators
Israeli Arabists
Academic staff of Tel Aviv University
Translators of the Quran into English
20th-century translators